Nahuel César Rodríguez (born 3 April 1987) is an Argentine footballer who plays as a defender for Sportivo Belgrano.

Career
Rodríguez's youth career got underway with local club Mitre (P), before joining Rosario Central. He departed in 2008, which led to Rodríguez rejoining Mitre (P). In 2011, following a successful trial, Rodríguez signed for Central Córdoba. The club won promotion in his first season of 2011–12, during which he scored two goals in thirty-one fixtures. Rodríguez scored another two in his first four appearances in professional football, netting in Primera B Metropolitana games against Chacarita Juniors and Flandria in August 2012. On 30 July 2013, Torneo Argentino A's Tiro Federal signed Rodríguez. He was selected twenty-nine times in 2013–14.

July 2014 saw Rodríguez joined Torneo Federal A side Mitre. One goal in twenty-four games followed over two seasons. On 6 January 2016, ahead of the 2016 Torneo Federal A campaign, Rodríguez made a move to join Sportivo Belgrano. He scored seven times in his first three seasons across fifty-five matches, with his first coming during a victory over Deportivo Madryn in May 2016.

Career statistics
.

References

External links

1987 births
Living people
People from Rosario Department
Argentine footballers
Association football defenders
Primera C Metropolitana players
Primera B Metropolitana players
Torneo Argentino A players
Torneo Federal A players
Central Córdoba de Rosario footballers
Tiro Federal footballers
Club Atlético Mitre footballers
Sportivo Belgrano footballers
Sportspeople from Santa Fe Province